Qarakosa is a village in the municipality of Ələt in the Qaradağ raion of Baku, Azerbaijan.

References

Populated places in Baku